The Monaghan Senior Football Championship is an annual Gaelic football competition contested by Monaghan GAA clubs. The Monaghan County Board of the Gaelic Athletic Association has organised it since 1888.

Ballybay Pearse Brothers are the title holders (2022) defeating Scotstown in the Final.

Honours

The trophy presented to the winners is the Mick Duffy Cup. The winners of the Monaghan Senior Championship qualify to represent the county in the Ulster Senior Club Football Championship. The winners can, in turn, go on to play in the All-Ireland Senior Club Football Championship.

List of finals
(r) = replay

Wins listed by club

References

External links
Current Monaghan official website
Official Monaghan Website - Archive
Monaghan on Hoganstand
Monaghan Club GAA

 
Monaghan GAA club championships
Senior Gaelic football county championships